Telphusa barygrapta is a moth of the family Gelechiidae. It is found in Indonesia (Java).

References

Moths described in 1932
Telphusa
Taxa named by Edward Meyrick